Famous Smoke Shop is one of the largest cigar mail order businesses in the United States. The company was formed in October, 1939 in Midtown Manhattan as a cigar and gift shop. In 2000, increasing rents and taxes forced the company to move its operations to Easton, Pennsylvania, a state that currently imposes no cigar tax. Famous Smoke Shop is engaged primarily in the retail and wholesale of cigars, humidors, and cigar accessories through mail order catalogs, a brick and mortar retail shop, and several websites.

Incorporation and growth

David and Rose Zaretsky incorporated Famous Smoke Shop in New York City in October 1939. In 1970, their son Arthur Zaretsky began working for the company. He assumed sole ownership in 1984.

Famous Smoke Shop has maintained a brick and mortar retail shop since its incorporation. The original shop was located at 1433 Broadway in New York City. The 350 sq. ft. store primarily sold imported and domestic cigars, as well as magazines and other sundries. In 1975, the company moved to a 550 sq. ft. location at 1450 Broadway. In 1986, unable to absorb increasing Midtown rents, the company moved its cigar store to a 1550 sq. ft. location at 55 W. 39th Street. Its current retail shop is located in the north end of its 24,000 sq. ft. Easton headquarters.

In 1970, Famous Smoke Shop published its first mail order cigar catalog. The catalog consisted of a typewritten pricelist of available cigar brands. The catalog is currently produced in-house by a staff of copywriters and graphic artists, and mailed monthly.

Between the years of 1992 and 1998, the cigar industry experienced an unprecedented boom. Cigar sales increased by as much as 36% in the first quarter of 1996. Increased sales during this period provided the company enough capital to upgrade its telephone and computer systems. During this period, the company also diversified its marketing efforts, expanding its catalog and developing a web presence.

Famous-Smoke.com was first published in 1997. The company now markets cigars through several web properties. In 2004, the company published an online auction website, CigarAuctioneer.com, which sells humidors, lighters, cigar cutters and cases to the highest bidder(s). In December, 2006 it published CigarMonster.com, a one deal a day website. It also operates CigarDomain.com, a cigar wholesale website.

Cigar manufacturing
Famous Smoke Shop is the sole owner and distributor of numerous cigar brands manufactured on its behalf by Rocky Patel, Padrón, La Aurora, and Don José "Pepin" Garcia, among others.

See also
 JR Cigars
 Thompson Cigar
 Fumée

Notes

References

External links
 Official website

American companies established in 1939
Retail companies established in 1939
Companies based in Northampton County, Pennsylvania
Easton, Pennsylvania
Privately held companies based in Pennsylvania
Mail-order retailers
Online retailers of the United States
Cigar retailers
1939 establishments in New York City